The Museu de Ciências Naturais da Fundação Zoobotânica do Rio Grande do Sul ("Museum of Natural Sciences of the Rio Grande do Sul Zoobotanical Foundation"), is a Brazilian museum located inside the Porto Alegre Botanical Garden. Open from Monday to Sunday 9am to 12pm and from 13h30 to 17h.

Emerged in 1954 from the breakup of a natural history collection of the Júlio de Castilhos Museum.
 
The permanent exhibition features 49 windows, that approach the richness of species native to Rio Grande do Sul, both flora and fauna. The show is organized in an evolutionary sequence: plant today, groups of animals and paleontological showcases. In this way, show the characteristic fauna of various ecosystems of the state: swamp, field and forest.

Paleontology

Here is an exhibition of fossils found in the geopark of paleorrota, besides contributing to publications on the subject.

See also
Paleorrota Geopark

References

External links
Site do Museu de Ciências Naturais

Geology museums in Brazil
Natural history museums in Brazil
Culture in Rio Grande do Sul
Museums in Porto Alegre